Novozinaidinskoye is a rural locality (a selo) in Rakityansky District, Belgorod Oblast, Russia. The population was 229 as of 2010. There are 4 streets.

Geography 
Novozinaidinskoye is located 7 km north of Rakitnoye (the district's administrative centre) by road. Zinaidino is the nearest rural locality.

References 

Rural localities in Rakityansky District